The Iranian Machine Design Competition is a national design competition for universities of Iran. This competition is held at the Sharif University of Technology, and different groups from around the country attend and compete in different categories such as conceptual, industrial, and scientific design.

History
The national competition of Electric Automobile Design was planned, held, and opened by the efforts of the Shahid Rezaie Research Center of Sharif University of Technology. The first course was held in 2006.

See also
Sharif University of Technology
Simorq

External links
Iranian Machine Design Competition in Persian

References

Recurring events established in 2008